Brideswell is a village located in the south of County Roscommon, Ireland. It lies 11km from the Centre of Athlone and 60km from Tuam Town.

Education 
Brideswell National School is the local national (primary) school, and caters for children from junior infants to sixth class. As of early 2020, there were approximately 50 pupils enrolled in the school. Saint Brigid's holy well is located next to the school.

Facilities 
There are two public houses in the village. A post office, which was located at the Eskerbane end of the village, is now closed. Adjacent to the post office there is a Gaelic handball alley, which has fallen into disrepair and is now rarely used. O'Connell's shop has closed down in recent years.

Sport 
The nearest sports club to the village is Cam Celtic soccer club, which plays its home matches in the local community centre. The local Gaelic football team is St Brigid's GAA. Handball is also played in the handball alley in nearby Curraghboy.

Gerald "Gerry" O'Malley (1928–2016) was a Gaelic footballer who played as a centre-back for the Roscommon senior football team. There is a memorial to O'Malley in the area.

Pattern 
The pattern (derived from the word 'patron' referring to a patron saint) is an annual event held in the village involving a Mass ceremony. This is followed by a festival in the village for the remainder of the day. The event is dedicated to St. Brigid and has been held annually (in July) since the mid 20th century.

References 

Towns and villages in County Roscommon